Thomas Stevenson PRSE MInstCE FRSSA FSAScot (22 July 1818 – 8 May 1887) was a pioneering Scottish civil engineer, lighthouse designer and meteorologist, who designed over thirty lighthouses in and around Scotland, as well as the Stevenson screen used in meteorology. His designs, celebrated as ground breaking, ushered in a new era of lighthouse creation.

He served as president of the Royal Scottish Society of Arts (1859–60), as president of the Royal Society of Edinburgh (1884–86), and was a co-founder of the Scottish Meteorological Society.

Life
He was born at 2 Baxters Place in Edinburgh, on 22 July 1818, the youngest son of engineer Robert Stevenson, and his wife (and step-sister) Jean Smith. He was educated at the Royal High School in Edinburgh.

Thomas Stevenson was a devout and regular attendee at St. Stephen's Church in Stockbridge, at the north end of St Vincent Street, Edinburgh.

He lived with his family at Baxters Place until he got married in 1848. He then got a house at 8 Howard Place. By 1855 he moved to 1 Inverleith Terrace.

From at least 1860 he lived at 17 Heriot Row, a large Georgian terraced townhouse in Edinburgh's New Town.

In 1869, as a successful experiment into using the newly invented electric light for lighthouses, Stevenson had an underwater cable installed from the eastern part of Granton Harbour, and a light on the end of the Trinity Chain Pier was controlled from half a mile away by an operator on the harbour.

He examined wind and wave effects, and his analysis is the first quantitative discussion of wave height as a (square root) function of fetch. His paper is one of the first quantitative studies of wind speeds in the planetary boundary layer. Motivated by practical applications, these are fundamental contributions. He designed the Stevenson screen as a shelter to shield meteorological instruments, and this has been widely adopted.

He died at 17 Heriot Row in Edinburgh on 8 May 1887 and is buried in the Stevenson family vault in New Calton Cemetery. The vault lies midway along the eastern wall.

Family
He was brother of the lighthouse engineers Alan and David Stevenson, between 1854 and 1886 he designed many lighthouses, with his brother David, and then with David's son David Alan Stevenson.

He married Margaret Isabella "Maggie" Balfour in 1848, daughter of Rev Lewis Balfour. Their son was the writer Robert Louis Stevenson, who caused him much disappointment by failing to follow the engineering interests of his family.

His wife's younger brother, James Melville Balfour (i.e. his brother-in-law), trained under D. & T. Stevenson and then emigrated to New Zealand, where he was first the marine engineer for Otago Province before he appointed Colonial Marine Engineer.

Lighthouses designed by Thomas Stevenson

Gallery

See also
Richard Henry Brunton, "father of Japanese lighthouses"
John Richardson Wigham, Irish inventor and lighthouse engineer

References

External links
Eilean Bàn – Kyleakin Lighthouse
'Lighthouse Library' of the Northern Lighthouse Board

1818 births
1887 deaths
19th-century Scottish people
Lighthouse builders
Presidents of the Royal Society of Edinburgh
People educated at the Royal High School, Edinburgh
Alumni of the University of Edinburgh
Scottish civil engineers
Scottish inventors
Burials at the New Calton Burial Ground
Scottish meteorologists
Scottish antiquarians
Engineers from Edinburgh
Stevenson family (Scotland)